Sahir Lodhi is a Pakistani actor, director and host. He made his film debut with Raasta.

Personal life
Sahir Lodhi was born in Karachi to Ali Kazim Lodhi and Roshan Gohar Lodhi. He has with two brothers (Amir Lodhi and Tahir Lodhi), and one sister Shaista Lodhi.

Controversy 
In 2017, Lodhi attracted widespread criticism when he publicly insulted a guest speaker on his show, whom he thought was criticizing Quaid-e-Azam. The host went on a long monologue that has since been questioned as being rehearsed to shut the guest speaker down.

Filmography

Film

Television shows

Radio shows

Lodhi hosts "It's My Show" on MERA FM 107.4. The show focuses predominantly on entertainment, fun and counselling. Lodhi occasionally invites guests and takes calls. Each episode features a special topic.

Awards

At the 1st Pakistan Media Awards, Lodhi received awards for his TV and radio shows.
 Pakistan Media Awards for TV Show Host (2010)
 Pakistan Media Awards for Best Morning Show (2010)
 Pakistan Media Awards for Best Radio Show (2010)
 Pakistan Media Awards for Best Radio Jockey (2010)

References

Pakistani television hosts
Living people
Pakistani radio presenters
Radio personalities from Karachi
Pashtun people
1968 births